The 1913 Wellington City mayoral election was part of the New Zealand local elections held that same year. In 1913, elections were held for the Mayor of Wellington plus other local government positions including fifteen city councillors. David McLaren, the incumbent Mayor, was defeated by John Luke by a relatively narrow margin, becoming the new Mayor of Wellington. The polling was conducted using the standard first-past-the-post electoral method.

Background
Incumbent Mayor David McLaren sought a second term, opposed only by former MP John Luke. To avoid a repeat of the previous election, a conscious effort was made to ensure only a single "anti-Labour" candidate for the mayoralty. The strategy worked, although Luke's slim majority of only 500 votes coupled with the fact that McLaren's share of the vote went substantially up caused real alarm. In addition the two sitting Labour councillors were re-elected with Labour's proportion of votes increasing there as well. This confounded expectations of a strong anti-Labour backlash at the polls following the Waihi miners' strike only months before.

Mayoralty results

Councillor results

Notes

References

Mayoral elections in Wellington
1913 elections in New Zealand
Politics of the Wellington Region
1910s in Wellington